Josef Abrhám (14 December 1939 – 16 May 2022) was a Czech film and theatre actor.

Biography
He originally began studying acting at Academy of Performing Arts in Bratislava and later moved to Theatre Faculty of the Academy of Performing Arts in Prague, where he graduated in 1962. While still a student, he played at the National Theatre, after graduation he performed for three seasons at the Vinohrady Theater. In 1965–1982 he was one of the leading actors in The Drama Club in Prague and has been noted as one of the Czech Republic's best performers. Then he briefly performed at the National Theater, but he ended his long-term commitment in August 1994 and (with two exceptions) quit theatre acting completely.

He was also a popular film and television actor. In 1962 he was given his first major film role in the film Transport from Paradise directed by director Zbyněk Brynych. This was followed by the major roles in The Cry (1963) and the role of writer Jaroslav Hašek in Velká cesta (1963). In the Czech Republic his most famous roles were seductive physician Blažej in the television series Hospital at the End of the City (1978 - 1981) and fake waiter Vrána in Waiter, Scarper! (1981).

In 1994 he won the Czech Lion Award for Best Actor in Leading Role for his role of Prokop in the film Big Beat. He was also nominated in 2006 for the Czech Lion Award for Best Supporting Actor for Beauty in Trouble and in 2011 for the Czech Lion Award for Best Actor in Leading Role for Leaving. In 2020, he received the Thalia Award for Lifetime Achievement.

Between 1968 and 1976 his partner was the actress Naďa Urbánková, he was married to actress Libuše Šafránková from 1976 until her death in 2021.

Filmography
  (1960)
 Transport from Paradise (1962)
  (1962)
 Strop (1962)
 The Cry (1963)
 Courage for Every Day (1964)
 Happy End (1966)
  (1967)
 Pensión pro svobodné pány (1967)
  (1970)
 Valerie and Her Week of Wonders (1970)
 Ezop (1970)
 Chance (1971)
 Morgiana (1972)
  (1973)
  (1974)
 Byl jednou jeden dům (1974) TV Series
 A Girl Fit to Be Killed (1975)
 Marecek, Pass Me the Pen! (1976)
 Hospital at the End of the City (1977) TV Series
 Ball Lightning (1978)
 Upír ve věžáku (1979)
 30 Cases of Major Zeman (1979) TV Series
 Run Waiter Run! (1980)
 The Hit (1980)
 Malý pitaval z velkého města (1982) TV Series
 Jára Cimrman Lying, Sleeping (1983)
 Svatební cesta do Jiljí (1983)
 Záchvěv strachu (1983)
 Dissolved and Effused (1984)
 The C.K.Deserters (1985)
 Druhý dech (1988) TV Series
 Člověk proti zkáze (1989)
 The End of Old Times (1989)
 In the Light of the King's Love (1990)
 The Beggar's Opera (1991)
 Kafka (1991)
 St. Nicholas Is in Town (1992)
 Very Credible Stories 2 (1992)
 Big Beat (1993)
 Angelic Eyes (1994)
 Halt, or I'll Miss! (1998)
 Return to Paradise Lost (1999)
 All My Loved Ones (1999)
 Elixír a Halíbela (2001)
 ELFilm (2001)
 O Víle Arnoštce (2002)
 Nemocnice na kraji města po dvaceti letech (2003)
 Pánská jízda (2004)
 Konečná stanica (2004)
 Beauty in Trouble (2006)
 I Served the King of England (2006)
 Leaving (2011)
 Přijde Letos Ježíšek (2013 film) (2013)
  (2015)
 Angel of the Lord 2 (2016)
 How Poets Wait for a Miracle'' (2016)

References

External links
 

1939 births
2022 deaths
People from Zlín
Czech people of Slovak descent
Czech male film actors
Czech male stage actors
Czech male television actors
Czech male voice actors
Academy of Performing Arts in Prague alumni
Czech Lion Awards winners
20th-century Czech male actors
21st-century Czech male actors
Recipients of the Thalia Award